Class 42 may refer to:

British Rail Class 42
DRG Class 42